White is a color.

White(s) or The White(s) may also refer to:

Arts

Music
 White (band), a progressive rock musical group
 White, a band whose "Future Pleasures" is a song in Guitar Hero Live
 White (Angela Aki album), 2011
 White (Show-Ya album), 1988
 White (Superfly album), 2015
 White (Made in France), an album by Rifle Sport, 1987
 The White Album (disambiguation)
 The White EP (disambiguation)
 "White" (CNBLUE song), 2015
 "White" (KAT-TUN song), 2011
 "White", a song by LIGHTS from Lights
 "White", a song by Wendy & Lisa, 1987
The Whites, an American country music group

Drama
 White (TV series), a BBC documentary series
 Whites (TV series), a BBC sitcom
 Three Colours: White, a 1994 film by Krzysztof Kieślowski
 White (play), a 2010 play for children by Catherine Wheels Theatre Company
 White: The Melody of the Curse, a 2011 South Korean horror film
 White (2016 film), a Malayalam film

Other
 The White, a fictional group in the Age of the Five novel trilogy by Trudi Canavan
 White Amp, a musical equipment brand
 White (novel), aka White: The Great Pursuit, a 2004 novel by Ted Dekker

Biology 
 Pierinae, a subfamily of butterflies commonly called the whites
Appias, genus of Pierinae sometimes called the whites
Pieris, a genus of Pierinae commonly called the whites or garden whites
Pontia, a third genus of Pierinae sometimes called the whites
 White (horse), a horse coloring
 White (mutation), a color mutation in fruit flies

People 
 White, a term sometimes applied to a person with light skin 
 White people, a population group identified in some countries, also referred to as whites 
 White Americans, a United States Census Bureau designation
 Non-Hispanic whites, a subset of the above; often conflated with "white" in the American vernacular
 White and Black in chess, identification of the players in the game of chess, referring to the colour of the pieces

Individuals
 White (surname), a family name
 White Burkett Miller (1866–1929), an American lawyer
 White Graves, an American football player

Places in the United States 
 White, Georgia, a city
 White, Missouri, a town
 White, South Dakota, a city
 White, Washington, an unincorporated community
 Whites, Washington, an unincorporated community

Politics
 White movement or the Whites, a Russian political movement
White Army, the armies of the White movement, also known as the Whites
 White (political adjective), describing one of several political movements
 Whites (Finland), the refugee government and forces during the Finnish civil war
 Whites (Montenegro), a pan-Serbian Montenegrin political movement

Sport 
 Cricket whites, the uniform worn by cricketers
 Swansea RFC or the Whites, a Welsh rugby union team
 The Whites, a nickname for English football club Bolton Wanderers F.C.
 The Whites, a nickname for English football club Fulham F.C.
 Los Blancos (the Whites), a nickname for Spanish sports club Real Madrid

Companies 
 White Airways, a Portuguese airline
 White (architecture firm), a Swedish company
 White Motor Company, a defunct maker of automobiles and trucks
 White's Boots, an American shoemaker

Other uses 
 Amphetamines, also known as "white crosses" or "whites" 
 "Chef's whites", a term for a chef's uniform
 Egg white, the clear liquid in an egg
 Sclera, the white part of an eye, commonly called the "white of the eye"
 White (crater), a lunar impact crater
 White Day, a holiday in Japan, South Korea, Taiwan and China
 White's, a London gentleman's club
 Whites in laundry, referring to fabrics
The whites, an old term for leukorrhea

See also 
 Bai people, a Chinese ethnic group, where bai means "white"
 Le Blanc (disambiguation)
 Justice White (disambiguation)
 List of people known as the White
 Whyte (disambiguation)
 Wight (disambiguation)